The football (soccer) Campeonato Brasileiro Série B 1997, the second level of Brazilian National League, was played from August 9 to December 7, 1997. The competition had 25 clubs and two of them were promoted to Série A and five were relegated to Série C. The competition was won by América-MG.

América-MG finished the final phase group with the most points, and was declared 1997 Brazilian Série B champions, claiming the promotion to the 1998 Série A along with Ponte Preta, the runners-up. The five worst ranked teams in each group (Mogi Mirim, Sergipe, Moto Club, Central and Goiatuba) were relegated to play Série C in 1998.

Teams

First phase

Group A

Group B

Group C

Group D

Group E

Second phase

1Náutico qualified after defeating Londrina on a penalty shoot-out.

Third phase

Group F

Group G

Final phase

Final standings

Sources

Campeonato Brasileiro Série B seasons
1997 in Brazilian football leagues